The Chattanooga Classic was a golf tournament on the PGA Tour from 1986 to 1992. It was played at Valleybrook Country Club in Hixson, Tennessee from 1983 to 1991 and at the Council Fire Golf and Country Club in Chattanooga, Tennessee.

It was founded in 1983 as the Michelob-Chattanooga Gold Cup Classic and from 1983 to 1985, it was part of the PGA Tour's "Tournament Players Series", a "satellite tour". In 1986, it was played opposite the U.S. Open and although the prize money counted as official the win did not. From 1987 to 1990, it was played opposite the NEC World Series of Golf and from 1991 to 1992 it was played opposite The Open Championship.

The purse for the 1992 tournament was $800,000 with $144,000 going to the winner.

Winners

Notes

References

Former PGA Tour events
Golf in Tennessee
Sports in Chattanooga, Tennessee
Recurring sporting events established in 1983
Recurring sporting events disestablished in 1992
1983 establishments in Tennessee
1992 disestablishments in Tennessee